In the Spirit may refer to:

In the Spirit (Stella Parton album), 2008
In the Spirit (Joe McPhee album), 1999
In the Spirit (film), 1990 film